Esmee de Graaf (born 2 August 1997) is a Dutch footballer who plays as a winger, full-back or forward for Eredivise team Feyenoord in the Netherlands, having previously played for PEC Zwolle and for West Ham United and Leicester City in England.

Club career

Early career and PEC Zwolle
De Graaf started her career senior career with PEC Zwolle in the Eredivisie of her native Netherlands having played for IJsselmeervogels and SV Saestum at junior level.

De Graaf finished her full debut season in 2015–16 as Zwolle's joint top-goalscorer with Judith Frijlink and went on to score 21 times in 74 league games during her time at club, eventually captaining the side and reaching the semi-finals of the 2016–17 KNVB Women's Cup.

West Ham and Leicester City
In July 2018 de Graaf transferred to West Ham United from PEC Zwolle. Having featured in 13 games and scoring 3 times in all competitions at the start of the 2018–19 season, de Graaf suffered an ACL injury that would rule her out long term, meaning she missed out on the club's run to the 2019 FA Women's Cup Final.

On 22 August 2020, de Graaf joined the newly professional FA Women's Championship side Leicester City on a free transfer. De Graaf ended her first season with Leicester having helped the side win the 2021–22 FA Women's Championship and promotion to the FA Women's Super League. On 23 May 2022, de Graaf departed Leicester City having achieved survival in the club's first top flight season, playing 53 games and scoring twice across her two years at the club.

Feyenoord
On 24 May 2022, it was announced that de Graaf would be joining Feyenoord in her home country on a two-year contract.

International career
De Graaf won her first cap for the Netherlands in February 2018, appearing as a 73rd-minute substitute for Shanice van de Sanden in a 6–2 win over Japan at the 2018 Algarve Cup.

Honours
Leicester City
FA Women's Championship: 2021–22

References

External links
 
Profile at OnsOranje.nl 

1997 births
Living people
Dutch women's footballers
West Ham United F.C. Women players
Women's association football forwards
Expatriate women's footballers in England
Netherlands women's international footballers
Eredivisie (women) players
People from Spakenburg
Footballers from Utrecht (province)
PEC Zwolle (women) players
Dutch expatriate sportspeople in England
Dutch expatriate women's footballers
Leicester City W.F.C. players
SV Saestum players
Feyenoord (women) players